Ponta Nhô Martinho is a headland on the Island of Brava, Cape Verde. It is the southernmost point of Cape Verde. It is located nearly 4 km south of Cachaço, the nearest settlement. Formerly, the point was called Salt Point (Portuguese: Ponta do Sal), for instance in the 1747 map by Jacques-Nicolas Bellin. There is a lighthouse on Ponta Nhô Martinho, which is the southernmost structure in Cape Verde.

See also
		
List of lighthouses in Cape Verde
Geography of Cape Verde

References

Headlands of Cape Verde
Geography of Brava, Cape Verde
Porto Novo Municipality
Ponta Nhô Martinho